BigDipper is a type of steel roller coasters by Mack Rides. Being the first of its kind, the roller coaster Lost Gravity opened at Walibi Holland in March 2016.

Driving system 
The trains run on steel rails. The short trains make it possible to drive through very tight curve radii. The roller coasters are basically driven by a chain lift hill, whereby the wagon after the lift covers the rest of the distance solely through gravity.

Trains 
The trains consist of individual wagons with two rows each. In each row there are four seats next to each other, with the two inner seats placed above the rail and the outer two next to the rail. The outer seats are also slightly offset upwards. This means there is space for 8 people in one train.

Installations

References

External Links 
 
 List of Installations on Roller Coaster Database
Roller coaster elements